The Fort Hancock Port of Entry is a U.S. Customs and Border Protection port of entry located on the U.S. side of the Fort Hancock–El Porvenir International Bridge along the U.S.–Mexico border. It was established when the original bridge was built by the International Boundary and Water Commission in 1936. The original port facility was replaced in 1955. In 2003, the General Services Administration replaced it with a new border inspection facility. Commercial vehicles are not permitted to enter the U.S. at this location.

In popular culture
In the 1994 film The Shawshank Redemption, Red (portrayed by Morgan Freeman) flees the U.S. at the Fort Hancock crossing.

References

See also
 List of Mexico–United States border crossings
 List of Canada–United States border crossings

Mexico–United States border crossings
1936 establishments in Texas
Buildings and structures in Hudspeth County, Texas